The Farnese Diadumenos is a 1st-century AD, slightly smaller than lifesize, Roman marble copy of Polyclitus's Diadumenos sculpture.  Once in the Farnese collection, it is now in the British Museum.

See also

 Vaison Diadumenos, also in the British Museum

Notes

External links

Ancient Greek and Roman sculptures in the British Museum
Diadumenos
Roman copies of 5th-century BC Greek sculptures
1st-century Roman sculptures
Archaeological discoveries in Italy